The Carnegie Theatre, or The Carnegie, is a theatre and arts centre located in Workington, Cumbria, England.

The historic Carnegie Theatre and Arts Centre is one of Workington's much-loved buildings. The Foundation Stone for the 'Carnegie Free Library & Lecture Hall' was laid by his Worship The Mayor, Alderman R E Highton on Thursday 10 September 1903. The building opened on Thursday 6 October 1904 following a donation of £7,500 from Mr Andrew Carnegie, the millionaire Iron Master and Scottish/American Industrialist and philanthropist.

Following that long tradition of a building for the people to this day a regular programme of music and dance events is enjoyed by local people and tourists, and classes and courses are held in the Carnegie Arts Centre every week with a variety of events within the theatre and arts space. Monroes Bar has a reputation for great quality live gigs, along with a busy cafe area open 6 days a week and spaces available for groups, workshops, business meetings and a wide range of other events.

Following a public meeting in 2011 The Carnegie Development Group was formed to support and secure a sustainable future for the Carnegie Theatre and Arts Centre as the prime venue for theatre, arts and culture in Workington and its surrounding districts.

The aims and objectives of the Carnegie Development Group are to:

1) Provide support to secure a sustainable future for the Carnegie Theatre and Arts Centre as the prime venue for theatre, arts and culture in Workington and its surrounding districts.
2) To work jointly with other organisations in Workington in marketing and publicity for Theatre and the Arts.

The theatre was taken over by the trust on the 01 May 2015 and is operated as a charity. It has a small number of paid staff that are managed by the board of directors (trustees).

The chair of the trust is Lee Martin-White.

References

Theatres in Cumbria
Theatres in Workington